is an erotic novel published in 1909 by Mori Ōgai in the 7th issue of the literary journal Subaru. The protagonist of the novel, Shizuka Kanei, is understood to be a semi-fictionalized autobiographical representation of Mori Ōgai.

Censorship 
Three weeks after its publication, Vita Sexualis was promptly banned from circulation by the Japanese Government due to its content. The story was deemed to be "dangerous to public morals", making the issue of Subaru where it appeared completely out of print.

References

External links 

 Complete Japanese text on aozora.gr.jp

1909 Japanese novels
Japanese erotic novels
Novels by Mori Ōgai